One of Those (also known as Totò, Peppino e... una di quelle) is a 1953 Italian comedy-drama film produced, written, directed and starred by Aldo Fabrizi.

Plot 
Maria is a widow with a dependent child, in debt with her landlord, and she tries to get by on small  tailoring jobs. One day she receives a visit from a neighbor, a prostitute. Praising the beauty of Maria, and understanding her economic difficulties, the prostitute suggests her to attempt the same profession, in her view the only way for a single woman to find the money to live.

Desperate by the personal and economic situation, Maria reluctantly accepts the advice and the next day she went to a nightclub, where she encounter two wealthy country men, the brothers Martino and Rocco.

Cast 

Lea Padovani as Maria Rossetti
Peppino De Filippo as  Martino Bardelli
Totò as  Rocco Bardelli
Aldo Fabrizi as  Dr. Ubaldo Mancini
Mara Landi as  L'entraineuse
Giulio Calì as  Guardamacchine
Nando Bruno as  Il tassista
Mario Castellani as  Il farmacista
Laura Gore as  Annie
Antonio Vaser as  Il portiere d'albergo
Alberto Talegalli as  Un burino
Pina Piovani as  La portinaia

References

External links

1953 films
1953 comedy-drama films
Films directed by Aldo Fabrizi
Italian comedy-drama films
Films about prostitution in Italy
Italian black-and-white films
1950s Italian films